Kekhvi ( Kekhvi,  Chekh,  Kekhvi) is an abandoned village (after 2008 Russo-Georgian War) in the Gori Municipality of Georgia. The village is located on the left bank of the Greater Liakhvi River. The Transcaucasian highway passes through the village. The road from Tskhinvali to Kekhvi – 7.38 km. Since the 2008 South Ossetia war the village is controlled by the breakaway republic and included in the Tskhinval district by its administrative divisions.

In the south of the village is situated the village of Kurta. In the east of the river – the village Kemerti.

North of the village is a small hydroelectric dam.

See also
 Shida Kartli

References 

Populated places in Gori Municipality
Populated places in Tskhinvali District